Jake Offiler is a London born rower who, as part of the United Kingdom team, won silver in the 2018 World Rowing Junior Championships. He is also a member of Globe RC.
Earlier in the 2017-18 season he was part of the Great Britain team that attended the 2018 European Rowing Junior Championships in Gravelines, France. There he won a gold medal in the double sculls, making him and his partner Great Britain's first Junior European Champions.

References

Living people
Year of birth missing (living people)
Rowers from Greater London
English male rowers